Luiz Gonzaga Paes Landim (31 May 1941 – 24 May 2021) was a Brazilian lawyer, professor and politician.

Biography
He served three terms as a deputy of the Legislative Assembly of Piauí and was superintendent of Sudene.

References

1941 births
2021 deaths
Members of the Legislative Assembly of Piauí
National Renewal Alliance politicians
Democratic Social Party politicians
Democrats (Brazil) politicians
Liberal Party (Brazil, 1985) politicians
People from Piauí
Deaths from the COVID-19 pandemic in Piauí